The molecular formula C20H32O4 may refer to:

 Arachidonic acid 5-hydroperoxide
 Hepoxilin
 Leukotriene B4 (LTB4)
 the main (acid resin) constituent of frankincense resin

Molecular formulas